Aegiphila caymanensis is a species of mint endemic to Grand Cayman. It is a scrambling shrub with one rooting point, it is inconspicuous when not in flower. This species is probably extinct; the last known specimen was bulldozed in August 2015.

References

caymanensis
Critically endangered plants
Endemic flora of the Cayman Islands
Plants described in 1933